Catoptria olympica is a species of moth in the family Crambidae. It is found in Bulgaria and Greece.

References

Crambini
Moths of Europe
Moths described in 1983